Daliang Subdistrict is a subdistrict in Shunde, Foshan, Guangdong, China, located to the east of Shunde City. It is the seat of the Shunde municipal government.

See also
 Qing Hui Yuan
Double skin milk

References

External links

Official site of Daliang Government (Chinese Version)

Shunde District
Township-level divisions of Guangdong
Subdistricts of the People's Republic of China